Malcolm Bruce Jackson (1872 – April 29, 1947) was a lawyer and political figure in British Columbia. He represented The Islands from 1916 to 1924 in the Legislative Assembly of British Columbia as a Liberal.

He was born in Woodville, Ontario, of Scottish descent, and came to Winnipeg with his family in 1880. He was educated in Winnipeg and at the University of Manitoba. Jackson received a law degree in 1908. He ran unsuccessfully for a seat in the Manitoba assembly in 1907 and in the Marquette federal riding in 1908. In 1909, he moved to Victoria and was admitted to the British Columbia bar. Jackson was defeated when he ran for reelection to the provincial assembly in 1924. Later that same year, Jackson was named special counsel in the Janet Smith case. He served as chairman of the Game Conservation Board for British Columbia. Jackson died in Victoria.

His son Hugh Arthur Bruce Jackson died in France at the age of 19 during World War I.

References 

1872 births
1947 deaths
British Columbia Liberal Party MLAs